Lewis Gilbert (born Adolphe Louis Dardart; 1862 – 15 March 1925) was a French-born British actor and director of the silent era.

Gilbert was born in 1862 in France. He debuted on a music hall stage with his parents, who had a song-and-dance act. His final film as an actor was The Divorce of Lady X (1938).

He was married to Lina Naseby. He died in 1925 in Camberwell, London, England.

Selected filmography
 She Stoops to Conquer (1914)
 The Manxman (1917)
 The March Hare (1919)
 The Mystery Road (1921)
 Gwyneth of the Welsh Hills (1921)
 The Oath (1921)
 Dick Turpin's Ride to York (1922)
 The Hound of the Baskervilles (1922)
 The Truants (1922)
 The House of Peril (1922)
 A Debt of Honour (1922)
 The Missioner (1922)
 The Wandering Jew (1923)
 Bonnie Prince Charlie (1923)
 Lamp in the Desert (1923)
 Chappy - That's All (1924)
 The Love Story of Aliette Brunton (1924)
 Money Isn't Everything (1925)
 Confessions (1925)

References

External links
 

1862 births
1925 deaths
British male silent film actors
French emigrants to the United Kingdom
20th-century British male actors